Bar-sur-Seine (literally Bar on Seine) is a commune in the Aube department in the Grand Est region of north-central France.

The inhabitants of the commune are known as Barrois or Barroises and Barséquanais or Barséquanaises.

The commune has been awarded three flowers by the National Council of Towns and Villages in Bloom in the Competition of cities and villages in Bloom.

Geography
Bar-sur-Seine is located some 20 km south-east of Troyes and 25 km north-west of Montliot-et-Courcelles. Access to the commune is by the D671 road from Virey-sous-Bar in the north-west which passes through the town and continues south-east to Celles-sur-Ource. The D443 comes from Magnant in the north-east also passing through the village and continuing south-west to Villemorien. The D63 also goes to Magnant by a slightly longer route. The D4 goes from the town to Ville-sur-Arce in the south-east. The D49 branches from the D443 on the right bank of the Seine and goes north-west to Courtenot. There is also the railway passing through the commune from Saint-Parres-lès-Vaudes in the north-east and continuing to the next station at Polisot in the south-east. Apart from the town there are the hamlets of Avaleur and La Bordé. There are large forests to the north-east and south-west of the town with the rest of the commune farmland.

The Seine river flows through the commune and the town from south-east to north-west and continues north-west to Troyes and beyond. The Ource river flows from the south-east and forms part of the south-eastern border before joining the Seine at the border of the commune. The Arce river joins the Seine on the right bank on the south-eastern border of the commune.

Toponymy
Bar is a Gallic word and perhaps even pre-Gallic which means "summit" or "height".

History
The town was devastated in 1359 by the English, when, according to Froissart, no fewer than 900 mansions were burnt. Afterwards it suffered greatly in the religious wars of the 16th century.

Bar-sur-Seine was the chief town of the district in 1790 and then sub-prefecture from 1800 until 1926.

Bar-sur-Seine minted deniers under Charles the Bald.

Under the Ancien Regime Bar-sur-Seine was located in the province of Burgundy.

Bar-sur-Seine appears as Bar ſur Seine, with a long s, on the 1750 Cassini Map and the same on the 1790 version.

Heraldry

Administration

List of Successive Mayors

Education
The commune has seven educational establishments:
Public Kindergarten of 14 July
Henri Breton private primary school
Georges Leclerc public primary school
Maurice Robert public primary school
Henri Breton College
Paul Portier College
Lycée professionnel du Val Moré

Demography
In 2017 the commune had 3,018 inhabitants.

Economy

Most Champagne vines are grown in the Marne department (on Cretaceous land) in the Marne valley (to the west of Château-Thierry) and on a series of lands straddling the Tertiary and Cretaceous (Avize, Vertus, Sézanne etc.)

Champagnes of Aube are very eccentric and very southern compared to other Champagnes and are grown on Jurassic lands which makes them distinctive. This area of Aube Champagnes includes other neighbouring communes such as Les Riceys and Bar-sur-Aube.

Culture and heritage

Civil heritage
The commune has a number of buildings and sites that are registered as historical monuments:
The Boulard Stationery factory (19th century)
The Charrier Mill (19th century)
The Bar-sur-Seine Glass and Crystal Works (1881)
A Timbered House at Rue Victor-Hugo (16th century)
The Domain of Villeneuve at Villeneuve (1874)
The Portal of Châtillon (17th century)
The Chateau of the Counts of Bar (13th century)

Religious heritage

The commune has two religious buildings and sites that are registered as historical monuments:
The Church of Saint-Stephen (16th century)
The Chapel of Avalleur (12th century)

The commune contains over 200 objects that are registered as historical objects. Most of these items are in the Church of Saint Stephen but there are many items in other locations.

See also
 Communes of the Aube department

References

External links

 Bar-sur-Seine Official website

Communes of Aube